The Hong Kong University of Science and Technology (HKUST) is a public research university in Clear Water Bay Peninsula, New Territories, Hong Kong. Founded in 1991 by the British Hong Kong Government, it was the territory's third institution to be granted university status.

HKUST is commonly regarded as one of the fastest growing universities in the world. In 2019, the university was ranked seventh in Asia by QS and third by The Times, and around top 40 internationally. It was ranked 27th in the world and second in Hong Kong by QS 2021.  It also ranked first in Times Higher Education Young University Rankings in 2019 and second by QS world's under-50 universities in 2020.

Today, the university consists of four main academic schools, offering programmes in science, engineering, business and management, humanities and social science, along with the Interdisciplinary Programmes Office, HKUST Fok Ying Tung Graduate School, Guangzhou HKUST Fok Ying Tung Research Institute, HKUST Jockey Club Institute for Advanced Study and HKUST Institute for Public Policy.

In Feb 2023, to coincide with its 30th anniversary, HKUST announced “30 for 30” talent acquisition campaign which is a global hunt for 30 leading academics to drive innovation in Hong Kong with 30 major research projects designed to have maximum social impact. The campaign focused on six areas – biomedicine, material science and future energy, artificial intelligence, fintech, green technology and art technology.

Identification

Logo
The HKUST logo is in several ways symbolic of the institution. Lyrically it visualizes the golden head of wisdom over the open book of knowledge. Between the arms holding the book can be seen as a flask representing science. Alternatively, it is a transmission tower representing engineering and technology or communication and management. A sun radiating gold can also be seen, that very traditional Chinese color, over an ocean glowing with the deep blue representative of Hong Kong. Supporting these emblems are the three Greek letters upsilon (υ), psi (ψ), and tau (Τ), that is: υψΤ transliterating as UST. The logo entwines many meanings, as does the University itself.

Icon
Few symbols represent an institution like the sundial represents HKUST, entitled "Circle of Time", the sculpture standing in the center of the Entrance Piazza was commissioned by the Hong Kong Jockey Club and created by two Irish-born, Perth (Western Australia) based sculptors, the husband-and-wife team of Charles and Joan Walsh-Smith.The sculpture is based on one of mankind's earliest scientific inventions: a sundial. The ability to integrate technology and nature into a seamless form personifies who they are as a university. Its elegance marries elements of the past, while remaining timeless, invoking the future with its minimalist lines, though instantly recognizable as the form of fire, the unity of these incongruent idea stands as a testament to what can be accomplished by the ambition of man.  

The sundial is made of steel and mounted on a paved podium of broad steps in the center of a pool of flowing water - a metaphor for the passage of time. The podium also incorporates a carved mural depicting 39 Chinese achievements in all fields of science and technology. The installation took place on October 8, 1991. The red sundial has then become an icon of the University, with its facets reflecting the interplay of form, function, history, and futurism.

From the Design theme:

"This major focal-point is a great, 8.5m tall 'Timepiece', which is a synthesis of art and science, in that it is a sculpture which actually functions as a sundial, and a sundial which is also a sculpture, irrespective of its functional element. The soaring, sweeping, graceful forms of this centerpiece, is suggestive of dynamic movement and complex rhythms of shape, which uses the Sun and its shadows as an intrinsic element of its function, both visually and aesthetically."

The future of Chinese science and technology cannot be met without a firm recognition of its past.  Taming the challenges in nature requires an understanding of its essential relationship with the sciences. The utility of an object cannot be separated from its artistry and the form that it takes. The “Circle of Time”, shows that only through the mastery of these dualities they can surpass their wildest dreams, being more than equal to any challenge ahead of them. At HKUST their will is greater than their ambition.

History
In the late 1980s the Hong Kong Government anticipated a strong demand for university graduates to fuel an economy increasingly based on services. Sir Sze-Yuen Chung and Sir Edward Youde, the then Governor of Hong Kong, conceived the idea of another university in addition to the pre-existing two universities, The University of Hong Kong and The Chinese University of Hong Kong.

Planning for the "Third University", named The Hong Kong University of Science and Technology later, began in 1986. Construction began at the Kohima Camp site in Tai Po Tsai on the Clear Water Bay Peninsula. The site was earmarked for the construction of a new British Army garrison, but plans for the construction of the garrison were shelved after the Sino-British Joint Declaration was signed in 1984.

Originally scheduled to finish in 1994, the death of Sir Edward in 1986 led to increased effort and allowed UST to open its doors early – in 1991. Several leading scientists and researchers took up positions at the new university in its early years, including physicist Leroy Chang who arrived in 1993 as Dean of Science and went on to become Vice-President for Academic Affairs. Thomas E. Stelson was also a founding member of the administration.

The project was criticised for surpassing the budget set forth by the Hong Kong Government and the Royal Hong Kong Jockey Club. However, under the fund-raising efforts of its President, Woo Chia-wei, the first students enrolled in October 1991. By 1992, accommodation and athletic facilities were expanded to support about 7,000 students.

Several more expansion projects such as the construction of the Hong Kong Jockey Club Enterprise Center have since been completed. The library extension building, Lee Shau Kee Business Building (LSK), Lo Ka Chung Building, South Bus Station, Undergraduate Halls VIII and IX, Cheng Yu Tung Building (CYT) and the Conference Lodge, are the latest additions to the campus.

Governance
Established in 1991 under Chapter 1141 of the Laws of Hong Kong (The Hong Kong University of Science and Technology Ordinance), HKUST is one of the eight statutory universities in Hong Kong. It is an institution funded by the University Grants Committee (UGC).

As with all other statutory universities in Hong Kong, the Chief Executive of HKSAR acts as the Chancellor of HKUST. Prior to the transfer of sovereignty over Hong Kong, this was a ceremonial title bestowed upon the Governor of Hong Kong.

Council
The supreme governing body of the university is its Council, formed by a total of 27 members. Council members include university administrators, the chairperson of the alumni Convocation, an elected staff member, an elected full-time student representative, as well as 17 "lay members" not being employees or students at the university. Under the HKUST Ordinance, The Chief Executive of HKSAR possesses the power of directly appointing the chairman and vice-chairman of the Council, the Treasurer of the University, and not more than 9 of the lay members.

Senate
The Senate acts as the university's supreme academic body, responsible for making and reviewing the academic policies of the university. It is composed mostly of academic staff members but also includes the Students' Union president, an elected representative of the undergraduates as well as an elected representative of the postgraduates.

Court
Being the supreme advisory body of the university, the Court is responsible for promoting the university's interests and to raise funds.

School management

President 

 Nancy Yuk Yu Ip (2022-present)
 Wei Shyy (2018-2022)
 Tony Fan Cheong Chan (2009-2018)
 Paul Ching Wu Chu (2001-2009)
 Chia Wei Woo (1991-2001)

Provost 

 Yike Guo (2022-present)
 Lionel Ni (2019-2022)
 Wei Shyy (2010-2018)

Vice-President for Administration and Business 

 Ting Chuen Pong (2021-present)

Vice-President for Research and Development 

 Tim Kwang Ting Cheng

Vice-President for Institutional Advancement 

 Yang Wang

Campus

The university is largely a campus university, occupying a 60-hectare site at the northern part of Clear Water Bay Peninsula in Sai Kung District, New Territories, Hong Kong, overlooking Port Shelter in Tai Po Tsai. The campus layout and architecture is based on a master plan submitted jointly by Simon Kwan & Associates and Percy Thomas Partnership, the runner-up entry in an architectural competition held before the university was founded.

As the campus has a sloped terrain, buildings and facilities are built on separate terraces carved out of the hillside, with the academic facilities occupying the top-level terraces, and undergraduate halls of residence and sporting facilities at the seafront. The terraces are connected by motor roads as well as a network of footbridges and elevators known as Bridge Link.

The countryside setting of the university contributed to the fact that HKUST was once the only public university in Hong Kong not being directly served by an MTR station, prior to the re-titling of the Education University of Hong Kong. The university is connected to the metro network through public bus routes including 91, 91M, 91P, 291P and 792M, complemented by a handful of minibus services, with Choi Hung and Hang Hau stations being the major feeder points.

Academic complexes
Academic activities are mainly conducted in the Academic Building, which contains 10 lecture theatres (A-H, J-K), a multitude of classrooms, laboratories and administrative offices. The lecture theatres can accommodate classes of up to 450 students and offer audiovisual equipment. In addition, an information center and a souvenir shop can be found at the Piazza.

Prior to 2013, offices and classrooms of all of the four schools were grouped under the same roof in the Academic Building. With the completion of the Lee Shau Kee Business Building (LSK) in 2013, most facilities for the School of Business and Management have relocated from the Academic Building. Opened in 2015, the Cheng Yu Tung Building (CYT) afforded the other schools with a lecture theatre (L), additional classrooms and laboratories.

Located at the southern tip of the campus, the Lo Ka Chung Building houses the HKUST Jockey Club Institute of Advanced Study (IAS). The adjacent Conference Lodge, managed by the hotel-operating arm of Chinachem Group offers on-campus accommodations for conference attendees and official guests of the university.

Student halls and staff housing

A total of nine undergraduate halls are located at the seafront and mid-rise terraces of the university campus. Also, the university provides 404 Senior Staff Quarters flats and 40 University Apartments flats to its eligible senior staff.

Lee Shau Kee Library

The HKUST Lee Shau Kee Library, part of the Hong Kong Academic Library Link (HKALL), occupies a central location of the campus. Connected to the Academic Building, it is accessible directly from the Hong Kong Jockey Club Atrium. It spans five floors with over 12,350 sq m of floor space, providing more than 3,674 seats as well as computing facilities. It offers a wide array of information resources, both local and remote. In addition to over 720,000 print and electronic volumes and a large collection of media resources, it provides access to more than 47,000 periodical titles, a large number of e-books, databases, and other digital information resources. The library also includes a 24-hour-capable Learning Commons which provides a technology-rich environment for active learning and education.

The library owns a collection of old maps of China and the rest of Asia, produced by Chinese and Western cartographers over the last 500 years. A selection of these maps, providing an insight into the history of international geographic knowledge, was published by the library in a limited-edition (1000 copies) volume in 2003.

Shaw Auditorium 
Donated by Shaw Foundation, Shaw Auditorium is a 4-storey multi-purpose auditorium designed for concerts, lectures, musicals and visual productions. The building consists of three superimposed elliptic rings surrounding a sculptural core. The rings that blend into the architecture provide shade and rain protection around the building. The auditorium is equipped with modular seating that can be adapted to allow for multiple arrangements, ranging from 850 to up to 1300 seats. Its curved walls can function as a 360-degree projection screen, enabling audio-visual experiences.  

HKUST opened Shaw Auditorium on 17 November 2021, as part of a celebration of the university’s 30th anniversary.

Ancillary services
The campus boasts 18 catering outlets including fast food restaurants, a Chinese restaurant as well as a restaurant serving international cuisine; other ancillary facilities in the academic complexes include three banks, a bookstore, a supermarket, clinics (consisting of a medical clinic providing free outpatient service to all full-time students and staff, a student dental clinic, and a staff dental clinic) and Students' Union offices.

Reputation and rankings

HKUST had been previously ranked Asia's No.1 by the independent regional QS University Rankings: Asia for three consecutive years between 2011 and 2013. It's one of the fastest growing institutions as ranked #1 young university by Times Higher Education World University Rankings in 2019 and #2 by QS world's under-50 universities in 2020.The THE'''s World Reputation Rankings of 2018 considered it the second reputable in the territory, while it was first in the HKU Public Opinion Programme survey (2016).

According to Global University Employability Ranking 2018, the University's graduates have the highest employment rate among universities in Greater China for 6 years in a row, ranked 16th worldwide. Besides overall rankings, a list of subject rankings of Hong Kong tertiary institutions is available to show the strength of its individual disciplines ranked by the above organisations.

Academic organisation

 School of Science 

Within the School of Science are the Division of Life Science, the Department of Chemistry, the Department of Mathematics, the Department of Physics, and the Department of Ocean Science. The School of Science emphasises the whole-person development and international exposure of students. Its undergraduate exchange program provides science students with international learning opportunities throughout their studies. The School has teamed up with over 60 exchange partners from regions including Australia, Canada, the United Kingdom, the United States, Mainland China, and Japan.

School of Engineering
The School of Engineering (SENG) is the largest of the 4 Schools within HKUST. It has 7 departments / divisions: Chemical and Biological Engineering, Civil and Environmental Engineering, Computer Science and Engineering, Electronic and Computer Engineering, Industrial Engineering and Decision Analytics, Mechanical and Aerospace Engineering, and Integrative Systems and Design. It is the only education provider on chemical engineering in Hong Kong. The School provides more than 40 degree programs at the bachelor's, master's and doctoral levels.

In 2019, Times Higher Education World University Rankings in Engineering and Technology placed HKUST Engineering No.23 globally, the best ever position achieved by any local university since the establishment of this league table in 2010. QS World University Rankings by Subject 2019 - Engineering and Technology ranked HKUST No.18 globally which made SENG No. 1 in Hong Kong for nine consecutive years. SENG has over 100 exchange partner universities in 28 countries/regions in the world.

Centre for Global & Community Engagement
The Centre for Global & Community Engagement (GCE) is established as co-curricular program under the School of Engineering, engaging students to make contributions to the community and to broaden their international exposure. GCE supports individuals and student teams such as the HKUST Robotics Team to participate in international competitions.

School of Business and Management

HKUST's School of Business and Management (SBM) is branded the HKUST Business School. Its Kellogg-HKUST EMBA program has been ranked the world's No.1 nine times (2007, 2009-2013, 2016-2018) by the Financial Times, while its full-time MBA program has been ranked the world's Top 20 ten times. The School has been awarded AACSB (Association to Advance Collegiate Schools of Business) accreditation since 1999.

There are over 140 faculty personnel. The School offers degree programs– undergraduate, MBA, EMBA, MSc and PhD – and a range of executive education. 7 research centres are assigned to areas from business case studies and investing to Asian Financial Markets and China Business & Management. The School is also placed to leverage its international and regional knowledge base as Asia rises in significance in the global economy. A new purpose-built campus is in place to enable the School to develop further.

 School of Humanities and Social Science 
The School of Humanities and Social Science supports interdisciplinary academic training and research in fields including anthropology, creative writing, economics, history, innovation studies, linguistics, literature, music, philosophy, political science, sociology.

 Interdisciplinary Programs Office 
The interdisciplinary programs bring together two or more different fields of study, offering a great opportunity for students with more than one interest to integrate their abilities. Programs are referenced to Hong Kong's needs and global trends to ensure relevance, with strong input from business and industry to keep training and skills in line with market demand. Research projects in partnership with industry and the community are encouraged through the Dual Degree Program in Technology and Management, Environmental Management and Technology program and Individualized Interdisciplinary Major program to allow full engagement of the students with the community.

Research Institutes and Centres

Nansha graduate school 
On 25 January 2007, the HKUST officially named its graduate school in Nansha as HKUST Fok Ying Tung Graduate School/ Guangzhou HKUST Fok Ying Tung Research Institute in a ceremony that combined the official opening of the graduate school and the ground-breaking of its Nansha campus.

Jockey Club Institute for Advanced Study
The HKUST Jockey Club Institute for Advanced Study (IAS) at HKUST champions collaborative projects across disciplines and institutions. It forges relationships with academic, business, community, and government leaders. The inaugural lecture of the IAS organised was given by the noted physicist Prof. Stephen Hawking in June 2006.

 Sustainable Smart Campus as a Living Lab initiative 
In 2019, HKUST launched the Sustainable Smart Campus as a Living Lab initiative. The initiative aims to transform the campus into a testing ground for learning, experimenting, and advancing smart and innovative ideas to address real-life challenges. Wei Shyy, the former President of HKUST, said the initiative is to "nurture a new generation who can produce original solutions with a sustainability mindset." As of 2021, around 30 sustainability-related projects has been launched.

 Examples of Sustainable Smart Campus as a Living Lab projects 

 Blockcerts 
HKUST launched “Blockcerts” platform in 2020 which is a blockchain-based degree authentication system to verify the documents such as graduation diplomas and academic transcripts. HKUST is the first university in Hong Kong to launch a similar system.

Student life
Student body
As of September 2018, HKUST enrolled 9,995 undergraduates and 5,560 postgraduates, with over a third of the total enrolment being non-local (not holding Hong Kong citizenship). In terms of student population, the School of Engineering is the largest among the university's four schools, hosting 34% and 40% of HKUST's undergraduates and postgraduates respectively; this was followed by the schools of Business and Management (34%/30%), Science (22%/18%), and Humanities and Social Science (2%/5%).

A total of 2,129 local students were admitted to undergraduate programs offered by the university in 2018/19. The university saw the graduation of 2,317 undergraduate students, 506 research postgraduates and 2,224 taught postgraduates in the same academic year, amounting to a total of 5,047 degrees being conferred.

Students' residence

All full-time registered UG students and in-time full-time HKUST research postgraduate students (RPgs) of the University are eligible to apply for student housing. Under the current policy, all local UG students are guaranteed at least one semester of hall residence in their first year of study upon application, whilst their non-local counterparts are provided at least two years of residency.

The nine on-campus undergraduate halls provide a total of 146 bed places in single rooms, 3,094 in double rooms (twin + bunk) and 792 in triple rooms. Another 512 bed spaces in double rooms at the off-campus HKUST Jockey Club Hall in Tseung Kwan O New Town are also provided for undergraduates. For research postgraduates students and visiting interns, 1080 on-campus residential places in single or double rooms are available.

There are also off-campus accommodations available. 15 apartments in Tai Po Tsai Village (TPT308 and Wan's Lodge) are rented by the University to accommodate 90 TPgs.

On 27 April 2012, research postgraduate students organised a sit-down strike to raise the voice of the voiceless and reiterate the concerns of the research postgraduate students about the serious housing issue.

Students' union

Formed in 1992, the Hong Kong University of Science and Technology Students' Union (HKUSTSU) is an organisation independent from but recognised by the university administration. The union is governed by four independent statutory bodies, namely the executive committee, the council, the editorial board and the court. All undergraduates and postgraduates are eligible for membership in the union, although this is not compulsory.

The students' union oversees over 100 affiliated societies catering to students engaged in different academic disciplines, residential halls, sports and interests.

Notable alumni

 The Hong Kong University of Science and Technology (Guangzhou) 
In 2018, HKUST signed collaboration agreements with Guangzhou Government and Guangzhou University to establish The Hong Kong University of Science and Technology (Guangzhou) (HKUST(GZ)) in Nansha, Guangzhou. On 29 June, 2022, Ministry of Education of the People's Republic of China approved the establishment of HKUST(GZ), which is the third university co-managed by China and Hong Kong. HKUST(GZ) officially opened on 1 September, 2022.

HKUST and HKUST(GZ) are under “Unified HKUST, Complementary Campuses”'' framework. Students of HKUST and HKUST(GZ) can take courses offered by both campuses, with credits mutually recognized and automatically transferable.

See also
 Education in Hong Kong
 Higher education in Hong Kong
 List of universities in Hong Kong
 Hong Kong Virtual University - a collaboration project initiated by HKUST

Notes

References

External links

Master of Science in Global Finance – partnership between NYU Stern School of Business and HKUST
Information Technology Service Centre (ITSC)
HKUST Path Advisor

 
Technical universities and colleges
Tai Po Tsai
Sai Kung District
Educational institutions established in 1991
1991 establishments in Hong Kong